U.S. Route 4 (US 4) in the state of New Hampshire runs for  across the central and southern part of the state, stretching from Lebanon on the Connecticut River border with Vermont southeast to Portsmouth on the eastern coast.

Route description
US 4 crosses the Connecticut River into New Hampshire in the community of West Lebanon, where it immediately intersects New Hampshire Route 10 (NH 10) which runs parallel to the river. US 4 turns south onto NH 10, and the two routes turn south, meeting NH 12A before turning toward and interchanging with Interstate 89 (I-89). At this point, NH 10 joins the I-89 freeway southbound, while US 4 continues east into downtown Lebanon. The road crosses NH 120, continues east, and interchanges with I-89/NH 10 again. US 4 continues east away from the freeway near Mascoma Lake, where NH 4A splits off to the southeast. US 4 continues east through Enfield and into Canaan, where it meets the southern end of NH 118. The road turns to the south at this point, passing through Grafton and Danbury, where US 4 meets the west end of NH 104 and continues south into Andover. In Andover, US 4 turns back to the east and meets NH 11 near NH 4A's eastern terminus. US 4 and NH 11 run concurrently through Andover for about  before splitting, NH 11 to the northeast and US 4 to the southeast. US 4 enters the town of Salisbury and crosses NH 127, before continuing into Boscawen and intersecting with US 3. US 3 and US 4 share a short concurrency (about ), before US 4 turns east to interchange with I-93 at Exit 17.

US 4 joins I-93 southbound and runs along the freeway until exit 15E in Concord. At this interchange, US 4 leaves I-93 and joins I-393 and US 202 which run eastbound out of the city. The two U.S. Routes overlap I-393 to its terminus in the northern corner of Pembroke. I-393 then ends, and US 4/US 202 merge onto NH 9 eastbound through Chichester and into Epsom. The road crosses NH 28 at the Epsom Traffic Circle, then continues east and intersects NH 107, forming a  four-route concurrency into Northwood, where NH 107 splits off to the northwest. US 4, US 202, and NH 9 continue through Northwood, and US 202 and NH 9 split from US 4 at an intersection with NH 43.

US 4 continues east, meeting the west end of NH 152 and proceeding into Nottingham and then into Lee, where US 4 meets NH 125 at a two-lane roundabout. After leaving this interchange, US 4 crosses into Durham and becomes a semi-limited-access highway. US 4 has a partial eastbound interchange with NH 155 and a diamond interchange with NH 155A down the road, providing access to the University of New Hampshire campus in Durham. US 4 has one more interchange, with NH 108, before becoming a full-access highway again. US 4 continues east toward the coast and crosses the tidal Bellamy River to enter Dover, then interchanges with the Spaulding Turnpike (NH 16).  US 4 joins the turnpike southbound, closely paralleling the Maine state border and crossing the Little Bay Bridge into the town of Newington before continuing into the city of Portsmouth. US 4 terminates just south of the Maine state line at the final southbound interchange with I-95, where the turnpike splits to merge with I-95 south, and NH 16 continues south to end at the Portsmouth Traffic Circle, providing access to I-95 north and US 1 Bypass.

History
The section of US 4 from the Vermont state line to Andover (and NH 11 from Andover to Franklin) was first numbered in 1925 as an eastern extension of Route 14. From Franklin to Concord, the road was designated as Route 6 (now US 3), and, from Concord to Northwood, it was Route 9 (now NH 9). Between Northwood and Dover, the road was previously not numbered. From Dover to its eastern terminus at Portsmouth, the road used part of Route 16 (now NH 16).

Junction list
Exit numbers listed are those of the primary highway with which US 4 is concurrent.

Special routes

 US 4 Alt.: Andover to Boscawen
 US 4 Byp.: Concord
 US 4 Alt.: East Northwood to Dover

Suffixed routes

New Hampshire Route 4A (NH 4A) is a  route between Lebanon and Andover, New Hampshire, serving as a shortcut around several villages on US 4. Until I-89 was built in the early 1970s, this was part of the main route between the Lebanon–Hanover area and the southeastern portion of New Hampshire. Today, traffic is very light on this road.

NH 4A is signed as a north–south highway, although its orientation is more southeast–northwest. The northern terminus is in Lebanon at US 4, near the western tip of Lake Mascoma. This highway is locally named the 4th New Hampshire Turnpike.

NH 4A is an alternate route of US 4, and not of NH 4, a completely different route located in Dover.

See also
New Hampshire Historical Marker No. 165: The Alexander Scammell Bridge over the Bellamy River
New Hampshire Historical Marker No. 181: First New Hampshire Turnpike

References

Further reading

External links

 U.S. Route 4 in New Hampshire on Flickr
 New Hampshire State Route 4A on Flickr

04
 New Hampshire
Transportation in Grafton County, New Hampshire
Transportation in Merrimack County, New Hampshire
Transportation in Rockingham County, New Hampshire
Transportation in Strafford County, New Hampshire